Ancistrophyllinae is a subtribe of plants in the family Arecaceae found in Africa. Genera in the subtribe are:

Oncocalamus
Eremospatha
Laccosperma

See also 
 List of Arecaceae genera

References

External links 

 
Arecaceae subtribes